The 1925 Sewanee Tigers football team was an American football team that represented the Sewanee Tigers of Sewanee: The University of the South as a member of the Southern Conference during the 1925 college football season. In its third season under head coach M. S. Bennett, the team compiled a 4–4–1 record (1–4 against conference opponents).

Schedule

References

Sewanee
Sewanee Tigers football seasons
Sewanee Tigers football